Sven-Erik Westlin (6 January 1934 – 9 May 2020) was a Swedish weightlifter. He competed in the men's lightweight event at the 1964 Summer Olympics.

References

External links
 

1934 births
2020 deaths
Swedish male weightlifters
Olympic weightlifters of Sweden
Weightlifters at the 1964 Summer Olympics
People from Sollefteå Municipality
Sportspeople from Västernorrland County
20th-century Swedish people